Charles Warren Noe (November 13, 1924 – December 8, 2003) was an American college basketball coach and broadcaster. Noe was credited by former University of North Carolina basketball coach Dean Smith with creating the 4-corner "stall" offense for which Smith became famous for utilizing at UNC, during Noe's time as hoops coach at the University of South Carolina.

Chuck Noe was a two-sport athlete at the University of Virginia, lettering in both basketball and baseball from 1944 to 1948.  Following his collegiate career, Noe played briefly in the Boston Red Sox chain, but his career ended due to a severely dislocated ankle.

Following the early end of his playing career, Noe turned to coaching.  He was first an assistant basketball coach at his alma mater, the University of Virginia, in 1948–49. He then coached at the high school level in the state of Virginia—football, basketball, and baseball at Madison County High School in 1950–51 and basketball at Hopewell High School in 1951–52. Noe got his first college head coaching job in 1952 when he was named head coach at the Virginia Military Institute (VMI).  Following three years at VMI, Noe moved to the same position at Virginia Tech.

At Virginia Tech, Noe had a successful seven-year stint.  His teams went 109–51 and in the 1959–60 season won the Southern Conference regular season championship, beating out West Virginia and star guard Jerry West.  His contributions at Tech earned him a spot in the university's sports hall of fame.

In 1962, Noe moved to South Carolina where he accumulated a record of 15–21 in a year and a half. In 1970, Noe became head basketball coach and athletic director at Virginia Commonwealth University (VCU) and led the program to NCAA Division I status.  He went 95–42 in six years as head basketball coach at VCU.  Following his career as a head coach, Noe became a sports radio host in Richmond, Virginia.

He died on December 8, 2003 in Richmond.

Head coaching record

College basketball

References

External links
 
 

1924 births
2003 deaths
American men's basketball coaches
American men's basketball players
Basketball coaches from Kentucky
Basketball players from Louisville, Kentucky
Baseball players from Louisville, Kentucky
El Paso Texans players
High school baseball coaches in the United States
High school basketball coaches in Virginia
High school football coaches in Virginia
South Carolina Gamecocks men's basketball coaches
Sportspeople from Louisville, Kentucky
VCU Rams athletic directors
VCU Rams men's basketball coaches
Virginia Cavaliers baseball players
Virginia Cavaliers men's basketball coaches
Virginia Cavaliers men's basketball players
Virginia Tech Hokies men's basketball coaches
VMI Keydets baseball coaches
VMI Keydets basketball coaches